The Center for Research on Computation and Society (CRCS, commonly pronounced "circus") is a research center at Harvard University that focuses on interdisciplinary research combining computer science with social sciences. It is based in Harvard John A. Paulson School of Engineering and Applied Sciences. It is currently directed by Milind Tambe.

History 
The center was officially founded in 2005, although there are appearance of CRCS affiliation back in 1996. The center name mimics the name of the centers for Internet and Society such as Stanford's or Harvard's.The Privacy Tools Project was one of the most important efforts led by CRCS. It received funding from multiple sources from 2009 throughout 2020 in order to research and build tools to enhance privacy, in a common effort with Harvard's Berkman Klein Center, Harvard's Data Privacy Lab, and MIT Libraries. The CRCS founding director was Stuart M. Shieber. After him, the center was directed by Greg Morrisett and later by Salil Vadhan until 2015, when Margo Seltzer was named new director. In 2018, after her departure to Columbia University, she was replaced as director by Jim Waldo. When Milind Tambe joined Harvard in September 2019 he became the new center director.

The center has a yearly fellowship program, and relevant past fellows include Simson Garfinkel or Ariel Procaccia. It also hosts regular public talks ("seminars") with distinguished invited speakers, which are usually video recorded. Some speakers include Susan Crawford, Bruce Schneier or Megan Price.

Research 
The center has covered a broad spectrum of research lines within computer science, typically with social aspects. These include social computing, privacy-enhancing technologies, encryption and data security, misinformation, machine learning fairness, internet of things, or a citizen-science platform.

See also 

 Berkman Klein Center for Internet and Society

References 

Research institutes in Massachusetts
Technology in society
Research institutes established in 2005
2005 establishments in Massachusetts
Harvard University
Computer science institutes in the United States
Scientific organizations established in 2005
Information technology research institutes